Javier Omar Delgado Papariello (born July 8, 1975) is a former Uruguayan footballer. He last played for Rampla Juniors in the Uruguayan Primera Division. He played as a midfielder.

External links

 Argentine Primera statistics
 Profile at Tenfield

1975 births
Footballers from Montevideo
Uruguayan footballers
Uruguay international footballers
Uruguay under-20 international footballers
Uruguayan expatriate footballers
Danubio F.C. players
Newell's Old Boys footballers
Club Atlético Colón footballers
Deportes Concepción (Chile) footballers
Expatriate footballers in Argentina
Expatriate footballers in Chile
Uruguayan expatriate sportspeople in Chile
Expatriate footballers in Colombia
Expatriate footballers in Russia
Club Nacional de Football players
Universidad de Chile footballers
FC Saturn Ramenskoye players
Deportivo Cali footballers
Central Español players
Rampla Juniors players
Uruguayan Primera División players
Argentine Primera División players
Russian Premier League players
Categoría Primera A players
1997 Copa América players
2004 Copa América players
Living people
Association football midfielders